Bob Johnson (born October 23, 1962) is a Democratic former member of the Arkansas State Senate and of the Arkansas House of Representatives. He was President Pro Tempore of the Senate for the 87th General Assembly session from 2009 to 2011.

Background

Johnson was born in the state capital, Little Rock.  He is a graduate of Bigelow High School and has a bachelor's degree in political science from the University of Arkansas at Little Rock.

He resides in Bigelow in Perry County with his wife and three children. He is a partner with his two brothers in several family businesses, including construction. His church affiliation is Baptist.

Political career
He served three terms in the Arkansas House of Representatives from 1995 through 2000. He was HKouse Speaker in 1999 and 2000. Thirty-five at the time he became Speaker, he was then youngest man in Arkansas history to hold that position. Johnson is one of a handful of Arkansas legislators who have served both as Speaker of the House and as President Pro Tem of the Senate.

Johnson served in the Senate from 2001 to 2011, when he retired because of term limits.  He represented Senate District 18, which comprises Conway, Perry, and Van Buren counties and portions of Cleburne, Faulkner, Pope, and Saline counties. As Senate President Pro Tem, he was in line to be acting governor when both the governor and the lieutenant governor are out of the state at the same time. He was a member of the Senate Committee on Insurance and Commerce and the Senate Committee on Transportation, Technology and Legislative Affairs, as well as the Joint Budget Committee, the Joint Performance Review Committee and the Senate Efficiency Committee.

References

External links
Arkansas Senate page

1962 births
Living people
University of Arkansas at Little Rock alumni
Arkansas state senators
Speakers of the Arkansas House of Representatives
Members of the Arkansas House of Representatives
Politicians from Little Rock, Arkansas
Businesspeople from Arkansas
Baptists from Arkansas
20th-century American politicians
21st-century American politicians